A mummy is an unusually well preserved corpse.

Mummy or The Mummy may also refer to:

Places
Mummy Range, a mountain range in the Rocky Mountains of northern Colorado in the United States
Mummy Cave, a rock shelter and archeological site in Park County, Wyoming, United States, near the eastern entrance to Yellowstone National Park
Mummy ride, a dark ride at three theme parks based on the film franchise

People
Mummy, a nickname for mother
Ray Schoenke, American football player nicknamed "The Mummy"
Joe D'Acquisto, professional wrestler nicknamed "The Mummy"

Arts and entertainment

Film
The Mummy (1911 film), an American movie made by the Thanhouser Company
The Mummy (franchise), an American horror/adventure film series by Universal
The Mummy (1932 film), an American movie starring Boris Karloff as Imhotep/Ardath Bey
The Mummy (1999 film), first Universal Pictures remake of their earlier 1932 film
The Mummy (2017 film), second remake of the 1932 film, and "reboot" of the 1999 version, starring Tom Cruise
The Mummy (1959 film), a British movie starring Christopher Lee as Kharis
The Night of Counting the Years (also released as The Mummy), 1969 Egyptian film directed by Shadi Abdel Salam
 Tale of the Mummy, a 1998 British-American horror film
Mummy (2016 film), an Indian Kannada-language film

Literature
The Mummy! (or The Mummy, or A Tale of the Twenty-Second Century), an 1827 novel by Jane C. Loudon
The Mummy, or Ramses the Damned, a 1989 novel by Anne Rice
The Mummy. A Handbook of Egyptian Funerary Archaeology, by Egyptologist E. A. Wallis Budge
Mummies: A Voyage Through Eternity, a 1991 illustrated book by Françoise Dunand and Roger Lichtenberg

Other arts and entertainment
Mummy (undead), a popular trope of horror fiction
The Mummy (TV series), based on the film franchise
The Mummy, a 1999 radio-drama produced by Radio Tales for National Public Radio
"The Mummy", a song by JJ Lin from the album No. 89757
"The Mummy", a song by Massacration from the album Good Blood Headbanguers
The Mummies, 1980s American garage punk band

Other uses
 Mummia, a substance also known as "mummy"
 Mummy brown, a pigment claimed to be made from mummies
 Mummy paper, a paper claimed to be made from mummies
 Mummy wasp, wasp of the genus Aleiodes
 Mummification (BDSM), a bondage practice

See also
Mom (disambiguation)
Mommy (disambiguation)
Mum (disambiguation)